Saaristoa is a genus of sheet weavers that was first described by Alfred Frank Millidge in 1978.

Species
 it contains five species, found in Europe, the United States, and Japan:
Saaristoa abnormis (Blackwall, 1841) (type) – Europe
Saaristoa ebinoensis (Oi, 1979) – Japan
Saaristoa firma (O. Pickard-Cambridge, 1906) – Europe
Saaristoa nipponica (Saito, 1984) – Japan
Saaristoa sammamish (L. R. Levi & H. W. Levi, 1955) – USA

See also
 List of Linyphiidae species (Q–Z)

References

Araneomorphae genera
Linyphiidae
Palearctic spiders
Spiders of Europe
Spiders of Asia
Spiders of North America